The Government of India has social welfare and social security schemes for India's citizens funded either by the central government, state government or concurrently. Schemes which are fully funded by the central government are referred to as "central sector schemes" (CS) while schemes mainly funded by the centre and implemented by the states are "centrally sponsored schemes" (CSS). In the 2022 Union budget of India, there are 740 central sector (CS) schemes. and 65 (+7+) centrally sponsored schemes (CSSs).

From 131 CSSs in February 2021, the union government aimed to restructure/revamp/rationalise these by the next year. In 2022, there were 157 CSs and CSSs with individual funding of over  each. Schemes can also be categorised as flagship schemes. 10 flagship schemes were allocated  in the 2021 Union budget of India. The subsidy for kerosene, started in the 1950s, was slowly decreased since 2009 and eliminated in 2022.

Implementation of government schemes varies between schemes, location, and depends on factors such as evaluation process, awareness, accessibility, acceptability and capability for last mile implementation. Government bodies undertaking evaluations and audits include NITI Aayog, Ministry of Statistics and Programme Implementation, and the Comptroller and Auditor General of India.

List 

Key
 Scheme: Name with abbreviation and official / literal translation
 CS/CSS: Central Sector / Centrally Sponsored Scheme
  New form of existing scheme

Legend 
 In 2021 the 10 flagship schemes were allocated 
 
 

Notes

Evaluations 
The Development Monitoring and Evaluation Office (DMEO) under the NITI Aayog is responsible for evaluations. Evaluation problems exist. Ministries such as the transport ministry can show immediate physical outcomes of its schemes whereas in health related schemes, in certain cases, there is no output to show for. Surveys trying to ascertain whether someone has benefitted from a scheme or not can result in someone denying being benefitted with the hope of receiving the benefit again. This kind of respondent bias in its various form is being addressed by Ministry of Statistics and Programme Implementation. The Comptroller and Auditor General of India also assesses the implementation of these schemes.

Effectiveness 
A number of schemes of successive governments are effective, while others are not effective. Despite various schemes and programmes targeted towards hunger, nutrition remains a severe challenge. The Supreme Court has advised the government to keep finances in mind when coming out with schemes. An example given was the Right of Children to Free and Compulsory Education Act, 2009, a shortage of both schools and teachers. Since their inception, flagship welfare schemes of the Modi government such as Namami Gange and Ayushman Bharat have been sanctioned more than what has been spent. A key issue is identifying who to transfer scheme benefits to and how. In 2017 Comptroller and Auditor General of India (CAG) called Beti Bachao Beti Padhao a failure as per its own objectives.

Awareness 
The government runs various initiatives to increase awareness of government schemes. Awareness of schemes affects the implementation of the schemes as well as who beneficiaries vote for and who they hold responsible for the success or failure of a scheme - the state or center. In 2021-2022 the Government of Goa launched a scheme Swayampurna Goa which involves a government official making eligible beneficiaries aware of the schemes and how to avail them. Nearly 80% of Beti Bachao Beti Padhao funds during 2016-2019 was spent on media advocacy.

Political credit and blame 
There is no official or legalised credit-sharing mechanism between the center and states for the schemes.

In 2014 Congress blamed the Modi government for taking credit for schemes undertaken by previous governments. In 2017 Bhartiya Janata Party (BJP) blamed Telangana Rashtra Samithi (TRS) for taking credit. The Himachal Pradesh government blamed NITI Aayog for a cut in funding to centrally sponsored schemes. In 2019 Mamata Banerjee blamed Modi for taking credit for Ayushman Bharat. In 2020 Modi blamed Aam Aadmi Party for not implementing a centrally sponsored sector scheme. In 2021 Smriti Irani blamed Mamata Banerjee for taking credit of schemes of the central government. BJP blamed Jharkhand Mukti Morcha for not implementing schemes properly.

Welfare schemes are used as electoral campaigns, beneficiaries as voters. Bharatiya Janata Party (BJP) has used its implementation of schemes as a vote bank in the 2017 and 2022 Uttar Pradesh Legislative Assembly elections, and the 2019 Indian general election.

Rationalisation 
Rationalisation is a means to improve governance of schemes. In 2002 there were about 360 CSSs. In 2022 there were 704 CSs. In 2016 a committee came out with the recommendation of rationalising, revamping and restructuring 66 CSSs, grouping them into umbrella schemes, core schemes and optional schemes on the basis of which identification would be easier and funding patterns would differ, among other recommendations.

In the case of a mission, or a scheme or programme becoming a mission or being coupled under a mission, it can mean a signal of prioritization with regard to implementation and funding. Similar schemes can be merged into each other and revamped. A mission can be merged into a new scheme.

State sponsored schemes list

Andhra Pradesh
 Amma Hastham
 Indiramma
 YSR Bima
 YSR Rythu Bharosa
 YSR Pension Kanuka
 YSR Sampoorna Poshana
 YSR Vahana Mitra
 Jagananna Gorumudda

Karnataka
 Vajpayee Arogyasri Yojana
 Shaadi Bhagya scheme

Madhya Pradesh
 Bhavantar Bhugtan Yojana
 Deen Dayal Antyoday Upchar Yojna
 Deen Dayal Mobile Health Clinic
 Ladli Laxmi Yojana
 Madhya Pradesh Rural Livelihoods Project
 Mukhya Mantri Yuva Swarozgar Yojana

Maharashtra
 Jalyukt Shivar Abhiyan
 Maharashtra Arthik Vikas Mahamandal
 Mahatma Jyotiba Phule Jan Arogya Yojana

Telangana
 Aarogya Lakshmi scheme
 Aasara pension
 Amma Odi & KCR Kit
 Double Bedroom Housing scheme
 Kalyana Lakshmi - Shaadi Mubarak
 Mission Bhagiratha
 Rythu Bandhu scheme
 Telangana Ku Haritha Hāram
 Telangana Sheep Distribution scheme

Odisha
 List of schemes of the government of Odisha

Tamil Nadu
 Amma Unavagam
 Samathuvapuram
 Uzhavar Santhai

West Bengal
 Kanyashree Prakalpa

Uttar Pradesh
 Kamdhenu Yojna
 Free laptop distribution scheme

See also 
 Poverty alleviation programmes in India
 Welfare schemes for women in India
 Social security in India
 Food security in India
 Welfare state
 Indian missions
 Subsidies in India
 India and the World Bank

References

Further reading 

Report of the Sub-Group of Chief Ministers on Rationalisation of Centrally Sponsored Schemes. NITI Aayog. 2015.

External links 
 
 Evaluation studies, Development Monitoring and Evaluation Office (DMEO), NITI Aayog
 Outlay on Major Schemes. Union Budget Explorer 2022-23. OpenBudgetsIndia.

 
India politics-related lists
India